The Embryophyta, or land plants, are the most familiar group of green plants that comprise vegetation on Earth. Embryophytes have a common ancestor with green algae, having emerged within the Phragmoplastophyta clade of green algae as sister of the Zygnematophyceae. The Embryophyta consist of the bryophytes plus the polysporangiophytes. Living embryophytes therefore include hornworts, liverworts, mosses, lycophytes, ferns, gymnosperms and flowering plants. The land plants have diplobiontic life cycles and it is accepted now that they emerged from freshwater, multi-celled algae.  

The embryophytes are informally called land plants because they live primarily in terrestrial habitats (with exceptional members who evolved to live once again in aquatic habitats), while the related green algae are primarily aquatic. Embryophytes are complex multicellular eukaryotes with specialized reproductive organs. The name derives from their innovative characteristic of nurturing the young embryo sporophyte during the early stages of its multicellular development within the tissues of the parent gametophyte. With very few exceptions, embryophytes obtain their energy by photosynthesis, that is by using the energy of sunlight to synthesize their food from carbon dioxide and water.

Description

The Embryophytes emerged a half-billion years ago, at some time in the interval between the mid-Cambrian and early Ordovician, probably from terrestrial multicellular charophytes, a clade of green algae similar to extant Klebsormidiophyceae. The emergence of the Embryophytes depleted atmospheric CO2 (a greenhouse gas), leading to global cooling, and thereby precipitating glaciations. Embryophytes are primarily adapted for life on land, although some are secondarily aquatic. Accordingly, they are often called land plants or terrestrial plants.

On a microscopic level, the cells of charophytes are broadly similar to those of chlorophyte green algae, but differ in that in cell division the daughter nuclei are separated by a phragmoplast. They are eukaryotic, with a cell wall composed of cellulose and plastids surrounded by two membranes. The latter include chloroplasts, which conduct photosynthesis and store food in the form of starch, and are characteristically pigmented with chlorophylls a and b, generally giving them a bright green color. Embryophyte cells also generally have an enlarged central vacuole enclosed by a vacuolar membrane or tonoplast, which maintains cell turgor and keeps the plant rigid.

In common with all groups of multicellular algae they have a life cycle which involves 'alternation of generations'. A multicellular generation with a single set of chromosomes – the haploid gametophyte – produces sperm and eggs which fuse and grow into a multicellular generation with twice the number of chromosomes – the diploid sporophyte. The mature sporophyte produces haploid spores which grow into a gametophyte, thus completing the cycle. Embryophytes have two features related to their reproductive cycles which distinguish them from all other plant lineages. Firstly, their gametophytes produce sperm and eggs in multicellular structures (called 'antheridia' and 'archegonia'), and fertilization of the ovum takes place within the archegonium rather than in the external environment. Secondly, and most importantly, the initial stage of development of the fertilized egg (the zygote) into a diploid multicellular sporophyte, takes place within the archegonium where it is both protected and provided with nutrition. This second feature is the origin of the term 'embryophyte' – the fertilized egg develops into a protected embryo, rather than dispersing as a single cell. In the bryophytes the sporophyte remains dependent on the gametophyte, while in all other embryophytes the sporophyte generation is dominant and capable of independent existence.

Embryophytes also differ from algae by having metamers. Metamers are repeated units of development, in which each unit derives from a single cell, but the resulting product tissue or part is largely the same for each cell. The whole organism is thus constructed from similar, repeating parts or metamers. Accordingly, these plants are sometimes termed 'metaphytes' and classified as the group Metaphyta (but Haeckel's definition of Metaphyta places some algae in this group). In all land plants a disc-like structure called a phragmoplast forms where the cell will divide, a trait only found in the land plants in the streptophyte lineage, some species within their relatives Coleochaetales, Charales and Zygnematales, as well as within subaerial species of the algae order Trentepohliales, and appears to be essential in the adaptation towards a terrestrial life style.

Phylogeny, evolutionary history and classification
All green algae and land plants are now known to form a single evolutionary lineage or clade, one name for which is Viridiplantae (i.e. 'green plants'). According to several molecular clock estimates the Viridiplantae split  to  into two clades: chlorophytes and streptophytes. The chlorophytes are considerably more diverse (with around 700 genera) and were originally marine, although some groups have since spread into fresh water. The streptophyte algae (i.e. the streptophyte clade minus the land plants) are less diverse (with around 122 genera) and adapted to fresh water very early in their evolutionary history. They have not spread into marine environments (only a few stoneworts, which belong to this group, tolerate brackish water). Some time during the Ordovician period (which started around ) one or more streptophytes invaded the land and began the evolution of the embryophyte land plants. Present day embryophytes form a monophyletic group called the hemitracheophytes.

Becker and Marin speculate that land plants evolved from streptophytes rather than any other group of algae because streptophytes were adapted to living in fresh water. This prepared them to tolerate a range of environmental conditions found on land. Fresh water living made them tolerant of exposure to rain; living in shallow pools required tolerance to temperature variation, high levels of ultra-violet light and seasonal dehydration.

Relationships between the groups making up Viridiplantae are still being elucidated. Views have changed considerably since 2000 and classifications have not yet caught up. However, the division between chlorophytes and streptophytes and the evolution of embryophytes from within the latter group, as shown in the cladogram below, are well established. Three approaches to classification are shown. Older classifications, as on the left, treated all green algae as a single division of the plant kingdom under the name Chlorophyta. Land plants were then placed in separate divisions. All the streptophyte algae can be grouped into one paraphyletic taxon, as in the middle, allowing the embryophytes to form a taxon at the same level. Alternatively, the embryophytes can be sunk into a monophyletic taxon comprising all the streptophytes, as shown below. A variety of names have been used for the different groups which result from these approaches; those used below are only one of a number of possibilities. The higher-level classification of the Viridiplantae varies considerably, resulting in widely different ranks being assigned to the embryophytes, from kingdom to class.

The precise relationships within the streptophytes are less clear . The stoneworts (Charales) have traditionally been identified as closest to the embryophytes, but recent work suggests that either the Zygnematales or a clade consisting of the Zygnematales and the Coleochaetales may be the sister group to the land plants. That the Zygnematales (or Zygnematophyceae) are the closest algal relatives to land plants was underpinned by an exhaustive phylogenetic analysis (phylogenomics) performed in 2014, which is supported by both plastid genome phylogenies as well as plastid gene content and properties.

The preponderance of molecular evidence as of 2006 suggested that the groups making up the embryophytes are related as shown in the cladogram below (based on Qiu et al. 2006 with additional names from Crane et al. 2004).

Studies based on morphology rather than on genes and proteins have regularly reached different conclusions; for example that neither the monilophytes (ferns and horsetails) nor the gymnosperms are a natural or monophyletic group.

There is considerable variation in how these relationships are converted into a formal classification. Consider the angiosperms or flowering plants. Many botanists, following Lindley in 1830, have treated the angiosperms as a division. Palaeobotanists have usually followed Banks in treating the tracheophytes or vascular plants as a division, so that the angiosperms become a class or even a subclass. Two very different systems are shown below. The classification on the left is a traditional one, in which ten living groups are treated as separate divisions; the classification on the right (based on Kenrick and Crane's 1997 treatment) sharply reduces the rank of groups such as the flowering plants. (More complex classifications are needed if extinct plants are included.)

An updated phylogeny of Embryophytes based on the work by Novíkov & Barabaš-Krasni 2015 and Hao and Xue 2013 with plant taxon authors from Anderson, Anderson & Cleal 2007 and some clade names from Pelletier 2012 and others. Puttick et al./Nishiyama et al are used for the basal clades.

Diversity

Bryophytes

Bryophytes consist of all non-vascular land plants (embryophytes without vascular tissue). All are relatively small and are usually confined to environments that are humid or at least seasonally moist. They are limited by their reliance on water needed to disperse their gametes, although only a few bryophytes are truly aquatic. Most species are tropical, but there are many arctic species as well. They may locally dominate the ground cover in tundra and Arctic–alpine habitats or the epiphyte flora in rain forest habitats.

The three living divisions are the mosses (Bryophyta), hornworts (Anthocerotophyta), and liverworts (Marchantiophyta). Originally, these three groups were included together as classes within the single division Bryophyta. They have usually been placed separately into three divisions under the assumption that the bryophytes are a paraphyletic (more than one lineage) group, but newer research supports the monophyletic (having a common ancestor) model. The three bryophyte groups form an evolutionary grade of those land plants that are not vascular. Some closely related green algae are also non-vascular, but are not considered "land plants".

 Marchantiophyta (liverworts)
 Bryophyta (mosses)
 Anthocerotophyta (hornworts)

Regardless of their evolutionary origins, the bryophytes are usually studied together because of their many biological similarities as non-vascular land plants. All three bryophyte groups share a haploid-dominant (gametophyte) life cycle and unbranched sporophytes (the plant's diploid structure). These are traits that appear to be plesiotypic within the land plants, and thus were common to all early diverging lineages of plants on the land. The fact that the bryophytes have a life cycle in common may thus be an artefact of being the oldest extant lineages of land plant, and not the result of close shared ancestry. (See the phylogeny above.)

The bryophyte life-cycle is strongly dominated by the haploid gametophyte generation. The sporophyte remains small and dependent on the parent gametophyte for its entire brief life. All other living groups of land plants have a life cycle dominated by the diploid sporophyte generation. It is in the diploid sporophyte that vascular tissue develops. Although some mosses have quite complex water-conducting vessels, bryophytes lack true vascular tissue.

Like the vascular plants, bryophytes do have differentiated stems, and although these are most often no more than a few centimeters tall, they do provide mechanical support. Most bryophytes also have leaves, although these typically are one cell thick and lack veins. Unlike the vascular plants, bryophytes lack true roots or any deep anchoring structures. Some species do grow a filamentous network of horizontal stems, but these have a primary function of mechanical attachment rather than extraction of soil nutrients (Palaeos 2008).

Rise of vascular plants

During the Silurian and Devonian periods (around ), plants evolved which possessed true vascular tissue, including cells with walls strengthened by lignin (tracheids). Some extinct early plants appear to be between the grade of organization of bryophytes and that of true vascular plants (eutracheophytes). Genera such as Horneophyton have water-conducting tissue more like that of mosses, but a different life-cycle in which the sporophyte is more developed than the gametophyte. Genera such as Rhynia have a similar life-cycle but have simple tracheids and so are a kind of vascular plant. It was assumed that the gametophyte dominant phase seen in bryophytes used to be the ancestral condition in terrestrial plants, and that the sporophyte dominant stage in vascular plants was a derived trait. However, research points out the possibility that both the gametophyte and sporophyte stage were equally independent from each other, and that the mosses and vascular plants in that case are both derived, and has evolved in the opposite direction from the other.

During the Devonian period, vascular plants diversified and spread to many different land environments. In addition to vascular tissues which transport water throughout the body, tracheophytes have an outer layer or cuticle that resists drying out. The sporophyte is the dominant generation, and in modern species develops leaves, stems and roots, while the gametophyte remains very small.

Lycophytes and euphyllophytes

All the vascular plants which disperse through spores were once thought to be related (and were often grouped as 'ferns and allies'). However, recent research suggests that leaves evolved quite separately in two different lineages. The lycophytes or lycopodiophytes – modern clubmosses, spikemosses and quillworts – make up less than 1% of living vascular plants. They have small leaves, often called 'microphylls' or 'lycophylls', which are borne all along the stems in the clubmosses and spikemosses, and which effectively grow from the base, via an intercalary meristem. It is believed that microphylls evolved from outgrowths on stems, such as spines, which later acquired veins (vascular traces).

Although the living lycophytes are all relatively small and inconspicuous plants, more common in the moist tropics than in temperate regions, during the Carboniferous period tree-like lycophytes (such as Lepidodendron) formed huge forests that dominated the landscape.

The euphyllophytes, making up more than 99% of living vascular plant species, have large 'true' leaves (megaphylls), which effectively grow from the sides or the apex, via marginal or apical meristems. One theory is that megaphylls developed from three-dimensional branching systems by first '' – flattening to produce a two dimensional branched structure – and then 'webbing' – tissue growing out between the flattened branches. Others have questioned whether megaphylls developed in the same way in different groups.

Ferns and horsetails

Euphyllophytes are divided into two lineages: the ferns and horsetails (monilophytes) and the seed plants (spermatophytes). Like all the preceding groups, the monilophytes continue to use spores as their main method of dispersal. Traditionally, whisk ferns and horsetails were treated as distinct from 'true' ferns. Recent research suggests that they all belong together, although there are differences of opinion on the exact classification to be used. Living whisk ferns and horsetails do not have the large leaves (megaphylls) which would be expected of euphyllophytes. However, this has probably resulted from reduction, as evidenced by early fossil horsetails, in which the leaves are broad with branching veins.

Ferns are a large and diverse group, with some 12,000 species. A stereotypical fern has broad, much divided leaves, which grow by unrolling.

Seed plants

Seed plants, which first appeared in the fossil record towards the end of the Paleozoic era, reproduce using desiccation-resistant capsules called seeds. Starting from a plant which disperses by spores, highly complex changes are needed to produce seeds. The sporophyte has two kinds of spore-forming organs (sporangia). One kind, the megasporangium, produces only a single large spore (a megaspore). This sporangium is surrounded by one or more sheathing layers (integuments) which form the seed coat. Within the seed coat, the megaspore develops into a tiny gametophyte, which in turn produces one or more egg cells. Before fertilization, the sporangium and its contents plus its coat is called an 'ovule'; after fertilization a 'seed'. In parallel to these developments, the other kind of sporangium, the microsporangium, produces microspores. A tiny gametophyte develops inside the wall of a microspore, producing a pollen grain. Pollen grains can be physically transferred between plants by the wind or animals, most commonly insects. Pollen grains can also transfer to an ovule of the same plant, either with the same flower or between two flowers of the same plant (self-fertilization). When a pollen grain reaches an ovule, it enters via a microscopic gap in the coat (the micropyle). The tiny gametophyte inside the pollen grain then produces sperm cells which move to the egg cell and fertilize it.
Seed plants include two groups with living members, the gymnosperms and the angiosperms or flowering plants. In gymnosperms, the ovules or seeds are not further enclosed. In angiosperms, they are enclosed in ovaries. A split ovary with a visible seed can be seen in the adjacent image. Angiosperms typically also have other, secondary structures, such as petals, which together form a flower.

Extant seed plants are divided into five groups:
 Gymnosperms
 Pinophyta - conifers
 Cycadophyta - cycads
 Ginkgophyta - ginkgo
 Gnetophyta - gnetophytes
 Angiosperms
 Magnoliophyta – flowering plants

References

Bibliography

 
 
 

Plants
Dapingian first appearances
Extant Ordovician first appearances